Physocephala is a genus of flies from the family Conopidae.

Species
P. antiqua (Wiedemann, 1830)
P. biguttata von Röder, 1883
P. burgessi (Williston, 1882)
P. chrysorrhoea (Meigen, 1824)
P. curticornis Kröber, 1915
P. floridana Camras, 1957
P. furcillata (Williston, 1882)
P. lacera (Meigen, 1824)
P. laeta Becker, 1913
P. laticincta (Brullé, 1832)
P. marginata (Say, 1823)
P. nervosa Krober, 1915
P. nigra (De Geer, 1776)
P. pusilla (Meigen, 1824)
P. rufipes (Fabricius, 1781)
P. sagittaria (Say, 1823)
P. texana (Williston, 1882)
P. tibialis (Say, 1829)
P. truncata (Loew, 1847)
P. vaginalis (Rondani, 1865)
P. variegata (Meigen, 1824)
P. vittata (Fabricius, 1794)

References

Bugguide.net
 Conopidae (Thick-headed Flies) Skevington, Thompson & Camras
 New Information on the New world Physocephala. Entomological News (Clave de las especies de Physocephala)

Conopidae
Conopoidea genera
Taxa named by Ignaz Rudolph Schiner